General Sir James Aylmer Lowthorpe Haldane,  (17 November 1862 – 19 April 1950) was a Scottish soldier who rose to high rank in the British Army.

Early life
Born to physician Daniel Rutherford Haldane and his wife Charlotte Elizabeth née Lowthorpe, James Aylmer Lowthorpe Haldane came from a family of distinguished Scottish aristocrats based in Gleneagles. He was cousin to Richard Haldane, 1st Viscount Haldane, Secretary of State for War 1905–1912, instigator of the Haldane Reforms.

Military career
In September 1882, after attending the Edinburgh Academy and the Royal Military College, Sandhurst, Haldane was commissioned as a British officer of the Gordon Highlanders. On 18 February 1886, he was promoted to the rank of lieutenant, and on 8 April 1892 to the rank of captain.

Between 1894 and 1895, Haldane was part of the Waziristan Field Force and participated in the Chitral Expedition. He was dispatched to quell the Afridis rebellion in the Tirah campaign for the next two years (1897–1898), was appointed a Companion of the Distinguished Service Order (DSO) on 20 May 1898, and became aide-de-camp to General Sir William Lockhart, Commander-in-Chief in India, later the same year.  Haldane fought in the Second Boer War in South Africa, where he was taken a war prisoner. While imprisoned in Pretoria, he planned the escape which made Winston Churchill famous. Haldane failed to escape at the same time and later complained of Churchill's lack of regard for those who should have escaped with him. However, Haldane later managed his own escape.

Haldane was appointed a staff captain in the Intelligence Section at the War Office on 27 June 1901, promoted to major on 23 July 1902, and received the brevet rank of lieutenant colonel on the following day. He was military attaché with the Imperial Japanese Army from July 1904 to September 1905 during the Russo-Japanese War, and accompanied Japanese forces into Manchuria.

Following promotion to brevet colonel, Haldane was appointed Companion of the Bath on 16 March 1906 and granted the rank of colonel on 29 October 1906. From 1906 to 1909, he served as assistant director of military intelligence. On 1 October 1909, Haldane was promoted to temporary brigadier-general and in 1910 become commander of 10th Infantry Brigade.

Haldane fought in World War I initially as General Officer Commanding 3rd Division, then part of the British Expeditionary Force. He was given command of 6th Army Corps in France in 1916.

After WWI, Haldane was appointed General Officer Commanding Mesopotamia in 1920 and remained in that post until 1922. He retired in 1925.

Death
Haldane died in his 88th year on 19 April 1950 at his home in London, his body was buried at Brookwood Cemetery, in Surrey.

Honours and decorations
 Order of the Sacred Treasure, Japan, 1905.

Selected works
Haldane's published writings encompass 6 works in 8 publications in 1 language and 311 library holdings.

Papers
LIDDELL HART CENTRE FOR MILITARY ARCHIVES
The papers of Lt Gen Sir Lawrence Worthington Parsons include letter from Haldane relating to 16 Irish Div 1916; the papers of Brig Sir James Edward Edmonds include 12 letters from Haldane 1905–1935 (ref: Edmonds)
BRITISH LIBRARY, ORIENTAL AND INDIA OFFICE COLLECTIONS, LONDON
Copy of Haldane's official report, Battle of the Sha-Ho, Second Japanese Army, operations from the 5 September to the 19 October 1904 (ref: 9057.de.2)
CHURCHILL ARCHIVES CENTRE, CHURCHILL COLLEGE, CAMBRIDGE UNIVERSITY
The papers of Maj Gen Sir Edward Louis Spears include correspondence 1934–1938 (ref: SPRS 1/156)
IMPERIAL WAR MUSEUM, LONDON
Diary as 10 Bde Commander, Shorncliffe 1912–1914; The papers of FM Sir Henry Hughes Wilson include correspondence with Haldane 1920–1921 (ref: HHW)
NATIONAL LIBRARY OF SCOTLAND, EDINBURGH
Collection of papers 1890–1950 (ref: MSS 20247-59); including letters and diaries; papers relating to his World War I service; papers relating to Mesopotamia 1920–1922

See also
 Military attachés and observers in the Russo-Japanese War

Notes and references

External links 
 Haldane, James Aylmer Lowthorpe Sir 1862–1950

1862 births
1950 deaths
Scottish military personnel
British Army generals of World War I
British Army personnel of the Second Boer War
British military personnel of the Chitral Expedition
British military personnel of the Iraqi revolt of 1920
British military personnel of the Tirah campaign
Burials at Brookwood Cemetery
Companions of the Distinguished Service Order
Gordon Highlanders officers
Graduates of the Royal Military College, Sandhurst
Graduates of the Staff College, Camberley
Aymler
Knights Commander of the Order of the Bath
Knights Grand Cross of the Order of St Michael and St George
People educated at Edinburgh Academy
People of the Russo-Japanese War
Recipients of the Order of the Sacred Treasure
British Army generals